Wang Yu (born 1 May 1971) is a Chinese human rights lawyer. She was arrested by Chinese authorities in 2015 when China initiated the 709 Crackdown against human rights attorneys. She was charged with inciting subversion of state power which is a serious offense in China carrying a life sentence. She was awarded an International Women of Courage Award in 2021.

Career 
Wang is a lawyer with the Fengrui law firm in Beijing. That law firm has been targeted by the government in its crackdown, which arrested two lawyers and one intern there in addition to Wang and her husband, Bao Longjun. Late in 2016, Chinese authorities released Wang Yu on bail after she was almost certainly coerced to give a televised confession in which she denounced her colleagues and suggested that her human rights work was the result of foreign activists out to smear China. “I won't be used by them anymore,” Ms. Wang said in a video published on a Communist Party news site. Her confession followed a pattern similar to those given to Chinese authorities by other lawyers, publishers and human rights activists. Friends said that although released from detention, Wang would still remain under surveillance by Chinese authorities for years and would not be free to come and go as she pleases.

Before her conversion to a human rights lawyer, Wang Yu was a business and commercial lawyer until an incident at a Tianjin train station in 2008. At that time she got into an argument with rail employees because she was denied entry onto a train even though she had a ticket. In a bizarre turn of events, she was charged with "intentional assault" and was imprisoned for more than 2 years. While in prison, she learned how prisoners were mistreated and tortured. When she was released in 2011, her conversion to a human rights lawyer was complete.

Since then, she became part of China's human rights movement. Her clients have included Ilham Tohti, a well-known Uyghur intellectual, the women's rights group known as the "Feminist Five,", activist Ye Haiyan, and the banned Falun Gong spiritual group. It was her use of social media to champion her causes that eventually led to her arrest on the subversion charges. In 2015, the government's Xinhua News Agency published a piece designed to tarnish her reputation, saying, "This arrogant woman with a criminal record turned overnight to a lawyer, blabbering about the rule of law, human rights, and justice, and roaming around under the flag of 'rights defense.'"

Wang Yu's human rights work is highlighted in the 2016 documentary directed by Nanfu Wang, Hooligan Sparrow. On 4 June 2016, Wang Yu was awarded the 21st prestigious Ludovic Trarieux International Human Rights Prize also called "The award given by lawyers to a lawyer". On August 6, 2016, the American Bar Association awarded its inaugural International Human Rights Award to Wang Yu, in absentia.  “In honoring Wang Yu, we pay tribute to her steadfast commitment to doing this essential work in China. We recognize her important work to protect human rights and to advocate that the Chinese government respect the independence of the judiciary and the legal profession and observe fair trial and due process standards—all principles guaranteed under Chinese and international law and critical to sustaining progress toward rule of law,” said ABA President Paulette Brown.

On International Women's Day (8 March) in 2021 Wang Yu was given the International Women of Courage Award from the US Secretary of State, Tony Blinken. The ceremony was virtual due to the ongoing COVID-19 pandemic and it included an address by First Lady, Dr. Jill Biden.  After the award ceremony all of the fourteen awardees were able to take part in a virtual exchange as part an International Visitor Leadership Program. Unusually another seven women were included in the awards who had died in Afghanistan.

References

1971 births
20th-century Chinese lawyers
21st-century Chinese lawyers
Living people
People from Hinggan League
Chinese prisoners and detainees
Chinese human rights activists
Chinese women's rights activists
Human rights in China
Women human rights activists
Chinese dissidents
Political controversies in China
Political repression in China
Torture in China
Recipients of the International Women of Courage Award